East African Examinations Council (EEAC) was a secondary-level testing agency of the East African Common Services Organisation (current East African Community). The East African Examinations Council Act, 1967 established it.

Zanzibar withdrew from the EAEC in 1970, and the Tanzanian Ministry of Education Curriculum and Examinations Section briefly took over examination proctoring for Mainland Tanzania when it withdrew from the EAEC in 1971. National Examinations Council of Tanzania (NECTA) is now the testing agency of Tanzania.

References

Further reading
 Kiwanuka, B.P. (East African Examinations Council registrar in Kampala, Uganda). "The East African Examinations Council." In: Examinations at Secondary Level. Commonwealth Secretariat, 1 January 1970. p. 50-53 (Document pages 59-61/99, file pages 58, 59, and 60). DOI 10.14217/9781848591820-10-eN.

1967 establishments in Africa
East African Community